is the fourth studio album released by An Cafe on September 9, 2009 in Japan and on October 2, 2009 in Europe. A limited edition was released as well, containing an additional DVD with several music videos. The album peaked at No. 20 on the Japanese albums chart.

Track listing

Personnel
 Miku – vocals
 Takuya – guitar
 Kanon – bass
 Teruki – drums
 Yuuki - keyboard

References

An Cafe albums
2009 albums
2009 video albums